HushPuppies is a French garage rock and indie rock band influenced by the various bands of the 1960s. Members of the group live in Paris, France, although originate from Perpignan and Bordeaux.

Members 
 Singer: Olivier Jourdan
 Guitar: Cyrille Sudraud
 Drums: Franck Pompidor
 Bass guitar: Guillaume Le Guen
 Keyboard: Wilfried Jourdan (Olivier's brother)

Biography 
Four of the band's members - Franck, Cyrille, Wilfried and Olivier - grew up in Perpignan, where they formed a group with others called the Likyds. This group specialised largely in cover versions of 1960s garage rock songs. The band split with four members later reuniting in Paris where they met up with Guillaume Le Guen from Bordeaux. This led to the formation in 2002 of HushPuppies.

The band describe their influences as being 1960s groups such as The Kinks, The Who and Small Faces.

In April 2003, their first demo went on sale, followed by a 12 track live album Live @ House of Live. In 2004, two EPs were released. The Garden being their first public presentation. 

The following year, the band's first album, The Trap, went on sale. On September 13, they played for a live concert on a London bus, in Paris with a French radio, Le Mouv. The album became an independent hit, selling more than 20,000 copies.

The band's second album, Silence is Golden, was released in November 2008.

In 2008, their song "You're Gonna Say Yeah!" was featured on the soundtrack of Guitar Hero World Tour.

The band's fourth album titled Bipolar Drift was released in 2011.

Discography

EP 
HushPuppies EP - 2004
Natasha
Classic
HushPuppies
All I Know
The Garden - 2004
HushPuppies
You And Me
Pale Blue Eyes
Automatic 6
You're Gonna Say Yeah! - 2005
 You're Gonna Say Yeah!
 Packt Up Like Sardines in a Crushtin Box
Single EP
 I'm Not Like Everybody Else
 CPPDCC (Ca Peut Plus Durer Comme Ca)
 Packt Up Like Sardines in a Crushtin Box (Live)
Bad Taste And Gold On The Doors EP - 2008
 Bad Taste And Gold On The Doors (I want my Kate Moss) (Radio Edit)
 Bad Taste And Gold On The Doors (I want my Kate Moss) (Cucumber Remix)
 Bad Taste And Gold On The Doors (I want my Kate Moss) (Munk & Thelonious Remix)

Albums 
The Trap - 2005
 1975
 Packt Up Like Sardines in a Crushtin Box
 You're Gonna Say Yeah!
 Marthelot 'N' Clavencine
 Sorry So
 Pale Blue Eyes
 Comptine
 Bassautobahn
 Alice in Wonderland
 Single
 You & Me
 The Trap
 Automatic 6
Silence Is Golden - 2007
A Trip To Vienna
Lost Organ
Moloko Sound Club
Bad Taste And Gold On The Doors
Love Bandit
Down, Down, Down
Fiction In The Facts
Lunatic's Song
Hot Shot
Broken Matador
Harmonium
The Bipolar Drift - 2010/2011
 Open Season
 Okinawa Living Wage
 Stop
 Low Compromise Democracy
 Zero One
 Every Night I Fight Some Giant
 Frozen Battle
 A Dog Day
 Poison Apple
 Rodeo
 Twin Sister

Live album
Live @ House Of Live - 2003
 Turn on the light
 You ain't better
 C song
 Six feet under 
 Emma
 Ça peut plus durer
 All I Know
 Natasha
 Anybody's answer
 HushPuppies
 Classik
 Behave

References

External links 
 Official Site
 Official Myspace

French indie rock groups
Musical groups established in 2002
2002 establishments in France
Musical groups from Paris